Marzabad (also Romanized as Marzābād; also known as Qarahchī-ye Aḩmadābād and Qūrchī-ye Aḩmadābād) is a village in Dizmar-e Sharqi Rural District of Minjavan District, Khoda Afarin County, East Azerbaijan province, Iran. At the 2006 National Census, its population was 653 in 121 households, when it was the former Khoda Afarin District of Kaleybar County. The following census in 2011 counted 790 people in 182 households, by which time Khoda Afarin District had risen to the status of a county and divided into three districts. The latest census in 2016 showed a population of 742 people in 205 households; it was the largest village in its rural district.

References 

Khoda Afarin County

Populated places in East Azerbaijan Province

Populated places in Khoda Afarin County